AstroPop is a real-time puzzle video game developed and published by PopCap Games.  The Adobe Flash version can be played online for free at several different websites, or a deluxe version can be downloaded and unlocked for a fee. The game is available for Xbox and Xbox 360 through Xbox Live Arcade. AstroPop was ported over to the PlayStation 2 in 2007 alongside another PopCap game, Bejeweled 2 which was released as a two-game compilation pack as PopCap Hits! Volume 1. The game has also been ported to cell phones.

Gameplay

The object of the game is to clear a certain number of bricks in each level in order to fill up the Brick-O-Meter. Players control a ship which moves horizontally along the bottom of the screen. The ship can grab and release bricks (up to 6 of the same-colored bricks at a time), moving them from one column to another. If the player releases bricks such that 4 of more bricks of the same color are touching, the bricks explode. As bricks explode, the bricks below move up to fill in the gaps. If this causes 4 or more bricks of the same color to meet, they too will automatically explode (referred to as a combo).

New rows of bricks continuously arrive from the top of the screen, at a rate directly proportional to the level of play. The game ends when any column of bricks touches the bottom, if the bricks touches those that the player is holding, or they touch the player's character (where it is possible to trigger a game over without an alarm or siren appearing for the former and the bricks cannot really reach the bottom-most row of the screen for the last two cases).

Reception 

Most reviews of the game indicated that, while somewhat similar to existing offerings, it offered enough new elements to be worth playing. In a review of the Xbox 360 version, TeamXbox concluded that "AstroPop offers enough fun in its gameplay and design to warrant the purchase." GameSpot, reviewing the mobile version of the title, felt that it played well and that it "should appeal to virtually every mobile gamer out there", resulting in a score of 8.5 out of 10.

References

External links
 Official AstroPop website at PopCap Games
 Xbox.com AstroPop game details page
 

2004 video games
PlayStation 2 games
Flash games
Mobile games
Original Xbox Live Arcade games
Puzzle video games
PopCap games
Video games developed in the United States
Windows games
Xbox 360 Live Arcade games
Xbox 360 games

Single-player video games